The 2008 Scottish Labour Party leadership election was an internal party election to choose a new leader of the Labour Party in the Scottish Parliament, and was triggered following the resignation of Wendy Alexander following a row over donations to her own leadership campaign in 2007. Iain Gray won the contest and was announced as leader on 13 September 2008.

It was the second Scottish Labour leadership election in as many years, the first being caused by the resignation of Jack McConnell, following the Scottish National Party's victory over Labour in the 2007 Scottish Parliament election, however in this election, Alexander was unopposed, meaning that no ballot actually took place.

The timetable for the election was finalised on Monday 28 July, having been put on hold for a month to allow the party to focus on the Glasgow East by-election, which ultimately saw the Scottish National Party overturn a 13,507 Labour majority to gain the seat. Nominations closed at noon on Friday 1 August with the result being declared on Saturday 13 September.

A deputy leadership election was held alongside the leadership election following the resignation of Cathy Jamieson on 28 July. Johann Lamont was elected deputy leader.

Successfully nominated candidates
Iain Gray — 13 nominations
Cathy Jamieson — 12 nominations
Andy Kerr — 10 nominations

Source: Scottish Labour

All three declared candidates received more than five nominations from MSPs, which was the minimum requirement for them to get onto the ballot paper by the close of nominations at 12:00 UTC+1 on 1 August 2008

Nominations

Candidates are initially nominated by their parliamentary colleagues from within the Scottish Parliament, following which Westminster MPs, constituency Labour parties and affiliated trade union organisation can submit 'supporting nominations', providing their backing to a specific candidates. These nominations can be seen in the tables below;

Result
The election took place using Alternative Vote in an electoral college, with a third of the votes allocated to Labour's MSPs, Scottish MPs and Scottish MEPs, a third to individual members of the Scottish Labour Party, and a third to individual members of affiliated organisations, mainly trade unions.

In order to be elected, one candidate must have achieved a majority of votes, i.e. 50% plus 1 vote.

Round 1

Round 2

Source: The Citizen: Campaigning for Socialism

Suggested candidates not standing
The following either publicly suggested they were considering standing for election or received media speculation to that effect. However, at the close of nominations they had not been nominated by any MSPs.

Charlie Gordon
Tom McCabe
Margaret Curran. Curran was considered to be a probable candidate; however, Curran subsequently stood in and lost the Glasgow East by-election on 24 July, raising questions over any leadership ambitions. Later stated she supported Gray.
Ken Macintosh. Macintosh nominated Andy Kerr on 31 July.

Timeline of events

See also 
 2008 Scottish Labour Party deputy leadership election

References 

Scottish Labour leadership election
2000s elections in Scotland
Scottish Labour leadership election
2008
Scottish Labour leadership election